, better known as Shion (meaning "lyrics-sound"), is a Korean Japanese R&B singer, who has been active since mid-2000s. Originally from the underground club scene, she has achieved widespread success in the mainstream J-pop scene since 2008.

Career

Early life
Born in Yokohama with South Korean nationality, she grew up with her parents who were owners of a shot bar and during her childhood she had always been close to black music sounds such as ones by Marvin Gaye and Diana Ross that were often aired in the bar. She began voice training at the age of 10 and later stayed in Detroit, United States, training under Keith John, a long time backing vocalist for Stevie Wonder. She entered the Yokosuka club scene, signing with an indie record label in 2004. One of her early notable works was to be featured by Sendai-based hip hop band LGY in their 2006 album Jointed 2 Homies.

Break
She released her first album Candy Girl on May 28, 2008 and it debuted at No. 9 on the Oricon album chart. Candy Girl was issued on an indie label, and it was the first indie-album in the history of the Oricon album chart to hit the top-10 spots.

She then released her first single, Last Song, in August of that year and second single, Rain of Tearz / Girlicious feat. DJ☆GO, in April 2009. Rain of Tearz / Girlicious feat. DJ☆GO debuted at No. 6 on the Oricon singles chart.

Her second album w/z Friendz peaked at No. 11 and third album Truth peaked at No. 7 on the Oricon album chart.

Arrest
On December 10, 2009, she was arrested for possession of various illegal drugs including ketamine. She confessed all the charges against her such as using the drugs she possessed, receiving a suspended 1-year jail sentence . She further revealed in the trial that she had attempted to commit suicide since October 2009.

Comeback
After three years absence, in July 2012, Shion released a song, "Distance", with a music video featuring model Hozunyam. In 2013, she made a surprise appearance in the Koakuma Ageha fashion magazine, as one of the issue's special guests along with Gackt and one other man, getting interviewed by Emiri Aizawa. She covered hide's song "Hurry Go Round" for Tribute VI -Female Spirits-, released on December 18, 2013.

Discography

Albums

Singles

Filmography

Television shows

References

Japanese rhythm and blues singers
Japanese women singers
Zainichi Korean people
Japanese people convicted of drug offenses
People from Yokohama
Living people
Musicians from Kanagawa Prefecture
Year of birth missing (living people)